Valisvarar Temple is a Siva temple in Sevur in Coimbatore district in Tamil Nadu (India).

Vaippu Sthalam
It is one of the shrines of the Vaippu Sthalams sung by Tamil Saivite Nayanar Sambandar and Sundarar.

Presiding deity
The presiding deity is known as Valisvarar Temple. The Goddess is known as Aram Valartha Nayaki.

Speciality
This place was worshipped by Vali.

References

Hindu temples in Coimbatore district
Shiva temples in Coimbatore district